The Budapest Twelve is a list of 12 Hungarian films considered the best from the period between 1948 and 1968. The films were chosen in secret ballot of the Hungarian film industry in 1968.

Budapest Twelve 
The International Federation of Film Critics (FIPRESCI) held its annual conference in Budapest in 1968, the year that marked the 20th anniversary of the nationalization of the Hungarian film industry. On this occasion, the department of film critics of the Alliance of Hungarian Filmmakers choose the best 12 films in a secret ballot. The films were screened at the 4. Hungarian Film Week and one year later aired on the Hungarian Public Television.

The full list of films:

 Frigyes Bán: Treasured Earth
 Miklós Jancsó: The Round-Up
 Zoltán Fábri: Merry-Go-Round
 András Kovács: Cold Days
 Félix Máriássy: Budapest Spring
 Zoltán Fábri: Professor Hannibal
 Imre Fehér: In Soldier's Uniform
 Károly Makk: The House Under the Rocks
 Ferenc Kósa: Ten Thousand Days
 István Gaál: Sodrásban
 Márton Keleti: The Corporal and the Others
 István Szabó:  Father

New Budapest Twelve 

In 2000, the Alliance of Hungarian Filmmakers and Television Directors along with the film and TV critic department of the National Association of Hungarian Journalists voted on the films they consider the best in the history of Hungarian cinema.

The full list of films:

 Miklós Jancsó: The Round-Up
 Károly Makk: Love
 Zoltán Huszárik: Szindbád
 István Szőts: People of the Mountains
 Géza Radványi: Somewhere in Europe
 Péter Gothár: Time Stands Still
 István Székely: Hyppolit, the Butler
 Zoltán Fábri: Merry-Go-Round
 András Jeles: Little Valentino
 Ildikó Enyedi: My 20th Century
 István Szabó: Father
 Zoltán Fábri: Professor Hannibal

References 

Lists of Hungarian films